The Pulque Tavern (Spanish:La pulquería) is a 1981 Mexican comedy film directed by Víctor Manuel Castro.

Cast
 Norma Alvarado
 Sonia Camacho
 America Cisneros
 Arturo Cobo
 Mari Carmen Conde 
 Enrique Cuenca 
 Luis de Alba
 Guillermo de Alvarado
 Michelle Dubois
 César Escalero
 Margarito Esparza Nevare 
 Isaura Espinoza  
 Mayte Gerald  
 Michel Grayeb 
 Lucía Gálvez
 Manuel 'Flaco' Ibáñez
 Gloria Alicia Inclán 
 Rafael Inclán
 Héctor Kiev 
 Carolina Magaña
 Patty Martínez
 Jeannette Mass 
 Jorge Mondragon 
 Sasha Montenegro
 Xorge Noble as El Sapo  
 Ruben 'El Púas' Olivares
 Polo Ortín
 Doris Pavel
 Roberto G. Rivera
 Jorge Rivero 
 Carmen Salinas 
 Shandira
 Rebeca Silva 
 Alfredo Solares
 Rafael Torres 
 Manuel 'Loco' Valdés
 Isela Vega 
 Pedro Weber 'Chatanuga'
 Alfonso Zayas

References

Bibliography 
 Charles Ramírez Berg. Cinema of Solitude: A Critical Study of Mexican Film, 1967-1983. University of Texas Press, 2010.

External links 
 

1981 films
1981 comedy films
Mexican comedy films
1980s Spanish-language films
1980s Mexican films